Sanusi Tjokroadiredjo (born 26 May 1925) is an Indonesian former sports shooter. He competed in the 50 metre pistol event at the 1960 Summer Olympics.

References

External links
 

1925 births
Possibly living people
Indonesian male sport shooters
Olympic shooters of Indonesia
Shooters at the 1960 Summer Olympics
People from Magelang
Sportspeople from Central Java